The  word Gamat, the Malay word for sea cucumber, refers to medicinal remedies derived from several species of the Holothuroidea family.

Uses
The golden sea cucumber (Stichopus horrens) is commonly used. Tripang Emas is usually the dried, powdered bodies of sea cucumbers made into a lotion or other topical salve.

It is sometimes mixed into clay and applied to the face as a mask treatment, or put in tea and consumed for stomach complaints. Users believe that a solution of sea cucumbers can heal cuts, skin eruptions, and ulcers, and claim that it has a beneficial effect on the immune system.

Scarcity
Sea cucumbers in the waters of Malaysia have been over-harvested to supply consumers of the folk remedy, and as a result the animal and its products are becoming scarce. Efforts to restock the fishery have not generally been successful. Recently, a sea cucumber aquaculture operation was opened on the shores of several Malaysian islands to increase the gamat supply.

See also
 Trepanging

Southeast Asian traditional medicine